Marangaroo Drive is an arterial east-west road located in the northern suburbs of Perth, Western Australia. This road was originally part of Warwick Road, but in the late 1970s, Warwick Road was realigned, so the section of Warwick Road that was east of Wanneroo Road was discontinuous with the part that was west. The part that was east was renamed Marangaroo Drive, after the suburb Marangaroo. Marangaroo Drive is now extended through the suburb of Ballajura so it connects with Hepburn Avenue.

Marangaroo Drive is now part of State Route 81, which Warwick Road is also a part of, connected by a small part of Wanneroo road. This route connects the coastal suburbs of Sorrento and Marmion with Ballajura.

Marangaroo Drive is almost entirely a four-lane dual carriageway with a brief section that is two-lane around the roundabout with Illawarra Crescent in Ballajura. It passes through mostly residential areas, also passing by Newpark Shopping Center, Girrawheen Senior High School and Koondoola Regional Bushland.

Junction list

See also

References

Roads in Perth, Western Australia